Kim Barry Brunhuber is a Canadian journalist and author.

He serves as a weekend anchor on CNN International hosting the European breakfast edition of CNN Newsroom. Before joining CNN, he served as anchor and reporter for the Canadian Broadcasting Corporation, including on the flagship news program The National and on CBC News Network.

Career 
Born in Montreal and raised in Ottawa, Brunhuber is of mixed Cameroonian and White South African descent.

He published a novel, Kameleon Man, in 2004. The novel was a shortlisted nominee for the 2004 ReLit Award in the fiction category.

He resides in Atlanta, Georgia.

References

Canadian television news anchors
Canadian television reporters and correspondents
Canadian male novelists
Canadian people of Cameroonian descent
Canadian people of South African descent
21st-century Canadian novelists
Black Canadian broadcasters
Black Canadian writers
Living people
CBC Television people
CNN people
21st-century Canadian journalists
21st-century Canadian male writers
Canadian male non-fiction writers
Year of birth missing (living people)